The Loft Theatre is a legitimate theater in downtown Dayton, Ohio.  It hosts productions of plays, musical theatre, and other live performances, primarily put on by its house company, the Human Race Theatre Company.

References

Theatres in Dayton, Ohio